Grishin is a Russian surname derived from Grisha, a short form of the name Grigori. The surname literally means Grisha's. It may refer to:
 Aleksandr Grishin (born 1971), Russian football player
 Aleksei Grishin (born 1979), Belarusian Winter Olympic freestyle skier
 Alexei Grishin (ice hockey) (born 1988), Russian ice hockey defenceman
 Anatoli Grishin (1939–2016), Soviet sprint canoer
 Anatoli Aleksandrovich Grishin (born 1986), Russian football player
 Boris Grishin (born 1938), Russian water polo player
 Gennadi Grishin (born 1964), Soviet and Russian football player
 Ivan Grishin (1901-1951), Soviet Colonel general and Hero of the Soviet Union
 Sergey Grishin (footballer, born 1951) (born 1951), Russian football player (senior career: 1969–1981) and team manager
 Sergey Grishin (businessman) (born 1966), Russian entrepreneur
 Sergey Grishin (footballer, born 1973) (born 1973), Russian football player (senior career: 1992–2005)
 Viktor Grishin (1914–1992), Soviet politician, Member of the Politburo (1971–1986) 
 Vitali Grishin (born 1980), Russian footballer
 Yevgeny Grishin (speed skater) (1931–2005), Russian speed skater
 Yevgeny Grishin (water polo) (b. 1959), Russian water polo player, son of Boris Grishin

Russian-language surnames